Beep Beep (Korean: 뛰뛰빵빵) is the fourth EP by South Korean boy band BTOB. It was released on February 17, 2014, consisting a total of 5 tracks with Beep Beep as title track and promotional single of the album.

Background
On February 8, 2014, Cube Entertainment uploaded individual teaser photos of BTOB's members and the track list for their new album. On February 12, 2014, 3 video teasers were uploaded on consecutive days with a snippet of the title track, Beep Beep On February 16, 2014, the music video for "Beep Beep" was released and on February 17, the EP was officially released.

Composition
The EP features a total of 5 tracks with 2 tracks co-produced by the members of BTOB themselves. The EP opens with Beep Beep, a song that boasts a balanced mix of hip-hop, pop, and a hint of R&B. The second track, Is This The End is a ballad track and the third track, Hello is a  classic up-beat track. It has a backbeat that is slightly rock influenced. The fourth track, Hello Mello is a mid-tempo track that is heavy on the slow rap and the fifth track, Never Ending (Melody) is a ballad dedicated to the group's fans (BTOB's fan club is known as "Melody").

Promotion
BTOB made their first comeback stage on February 20 at Mnet's M!Countdown, February 20 on KBS's Music Bank and February 22 at MBC's Show! Music Core. The group also held fan meetings in four cities around South Korea, namely Busan, Daegu, Daejeon and Seoul. The group will also be carrying out activities on variety shows and radio broadcasts to promote the EP.

Commercial performance
Following the release of the EP, Beep Beep was number one on Hanteo real time charts on February 17, 2014, at 15:00 (KST). The album was also ranked in the top three positions on major online real time charts such as Bugs and Soribada. Beep Beep has also made it to number one on Hanteo's weekly charts

Track listing
※ Track in Bold is the title track of the album.

Charts

Sales and certifications

Release history

 Release date for worldwide may vary in different countries

References

External links

Cube Entertainment EPs
Dance-pop EPs
2014 EPs
BtoB (band) EPs
Korean-language EPs